AgBase is a curated genomic database containing functional annotations of agriculturally important animals, plants, microbes and parasites. AgBase biocurators provides annotation of Gene Ontology terms and Plant ontology terms for gene products. By 2011 AgBase provided information for 18 organisms including horse, cat, dog, cotton, rice and soybean.

See also
 Agronomy
 Genomics

References

External links
 http://agbase.arizona.edu/

Biological databases
Agronomy